Chetcuti is a surname. Notable people with the surname include:

 Andrew Chetcuti (born 1992), Maltese swimmer
 Frans Chetcuti (born 1943), Maltese sports shooter
 Jeffrey Chetcuti (born 1974), Maltese professional footballer
 Jimmy Chetcuti (born 1913), Maltese water polo player
 Kayleigh Chetcuti (born 2000), Maltese footballer
 Mark Chetcuti (born 1958), Chief Justice of Malta
 William Chetcuti (born 1985), Maltese sport shooter

Maltese-language surnames